Estil Lagoon, One of the tourist attractions in Astara city, Iran. Located along the Astara – Rasht road. This Lagoon is 138 acres. Estil Lagoon has been identified as one of the top five places of tourism in the Gilan Province in 2005 .

See also
 Heyran village, Astara
 Heyran Gondola lift, Astara
 Laton Waterfall
 Anzali Lagoon
 Astarachay

References

External links 
 Photos Astara (1) 
 Photos Astara (2)

Astara, Iran
Lagoons of Iran
Ramsar sites in Iran
Wetlands of Iran
Landforms of Gilan Province
Tourist attractions in Gilan Province